The 2021 Boston College Eagles football team represented Boston College during the 2021 NCAA Division I FBS football season. The Eagles played their home games at Alumni Stadium in Chestnut Hill, Massachusetts, and competed in the Atlantic Coast Conference (ACC). The team was led by second-year head coach Jeff Hafley. It was the first season with fans at Alumni Stadium since 2019.

After finishing their regular season with a 6–6 record, the Eagles accepted a bid to play in the Military Bowl, where they were due to face the East Carolina Pirates. On December 26, the Eagles withdrew from the game, due to COVID-19 issues; the bowl was subsequently canceled.

Schedule

Source:

Rankings

Players drafted into the NFL

References

Boston College
Boston College Eagles football seasons
Boston College Eagles football
Boston College Eagles football